This is a list of electoral results for the electoral district of Maryborough and Daylesford in Victorian state elections.

Members for Maryborough and Daylesford

Election results

Elections in the 1940s

Elections in the 1930s

 Two party preferred vote was estimated.

Elections in the 1920s

References

Victoria (Australia) state electoral results by district